The 2018–19 Men's Belgian Hockey League was the 100th season of the Belgian field hockey men's top division. It began on 2 September 2018 and it concluded with the second leg of the championship final on 12 May 2019. Dragons were the defending champions, having won the 2017–18 season. 

Léopold won their 28th title by defeating Beerschot 6–5 in aggregate in the championship final (two-legged tie).

Teams

Number of teams by provinces

Regular season

The twelve teams are grouped in two pools of six (Pool A and Pool B) based on the previous season's ranking :
 Pool A : 1, 4, 5, 8, 9, National 1 (2)
 Pool B : 2, 3, 6, 7, 10, National 1 (1)
The teams of the same pool compete 2 times and face the teams of the other pool once. The first four of each pool are qualified for the play-offs and the last two of each pool play the play-downs.

Pool A

Pool B

Play-offs 
All rounds are played in a two-legged tie. The scheme for the quarter-finals is as follows :
Series 1: 1A/4B
Series 2: 2B/3A
Series 3: 1B/4A
Series 4: 2A/3B
The semi-finals are played between the winners of series 1 and 2 and the winners of series 3 and 4. The winners qualify for the championship final where the two teams compete to decide who will be crowned Belgian champion.

Bracket

Quarter-finals

(1A) Racing vs (4B) Herakles

Herakles won series 3-3 (3-1) in aggregate after penalty shoot-out.

(2B) Gantoise vs (3A) Beerschot

Beerschot won series 3-2 in aggregate.

(1B) Waterloo Ducks vs (4A) Dragons

Dragons won series 6-5 in aggregate.

(2A) Orée vs (3B) Léopold

Léopold won series 8-5 in aggregate.

Semi-finals
The semi-finals were played from 1 to 5 May 2019 at Herakles.

Herakles vs Beerschot

Beerschot won series 7–5 in aggregate.

Dragons vs Léopold

Léopold won series 4–3 in aggregate.

EHL play-off
The EHL play-off was played from 11 to 12 May 2019 at Herakles. The third place winner is qualified for the 2019–20 Euro Hockey League.

Herakles won series 6–6 (5-3) in aggregate after penalty shoot-out.

Final
The final was played from 11 to 12 May 2019 at Herakles. Both teams are qualified for the 2019–20 Euro Hockey League.

Léopold won series 6–5.

References 

2018–19
Bel
Hockey
Hockey